Clemmons Educational State Forest (CESF) is a  North Carolina State Forest in Clayton.  It is North Carolina's first educational state forest, and it is operated by the North Carolina Forest Service. The site features self-guided nature trails with audio exhibit stations, the Forestry Exhibit Center with interactive exhibits about the ecology of forests, soil, water, wildlife and the state's cultural history.

There are 4 main trails with 8 miles of hiking available.  The two audio trails ("Talking Trees" trail and the "Talking Rocks" trail) feature recorded messages about the history of the forest and trees as well as geology of North Carolina.  The Forest Demonstration trail shows actual forestry practices, while the Watershed Extension loop features streams, hills, and other interesting sites.  There are picnic sites as well as a large covered picnic shelter available for the public to use.  Another interesting feature is a large 40 feet by 24 feet deck overlooking a 3-acre pond with a large map of North Carolina showing all of the river basins in the state.  Children and adults enjoy feeding the fish from the deck also.  Forest rangers offer education programs for school groups.

References

External links

Education information
NC ECHO - Clemmons Educational State Forest

North Carolina state forests
Museums in Johnston County, North Carolina
Museums in Wake County, North Carolina
Forestry museums in the United States
Nature centers in North Carolina
Natural history museums in North Carolina
Protected areas of Johnston County, North Carolina
Protected areas of Wake County, North Carolina
Education in Johnston County, North Carolina
Education in Wake County, North Carolina
Open-air museums in North Carolina